Alexandrine-Jeanne Le Normant d'Étiolles (10 August 1744 – 15 June 1754) was a member of French nobility as the daughter of Madame de Pompadour, the maîtresse-en-titre of King Louis XV of France.

Life
Alexandrine-Jeanne Le Normant d'Étiolles was born on 10 August 1744 to Charles-Guillaume Le Normant d'Étiolles (1717–1799) and his wife, born Jeanne-Antoinette Poisson (1721–1764). It is possible that her parents were first cousins, since it could be that Jeanne-Antoinette's real father was her legal guardian, Charles François Paul Le Normant de Tournehem (1684–1751), Charles-Guillaume's uncle. The couple had one other child,  Charles-Guillaume-Louis (1741–1742), who had already died by the time Alexandrine was born. 

Her family called Alexandrine "Fanfan". She was noted for being a very thin child, but she was healthy. François Poisson, Madame Le Normant d'Étiolles' father, doted on his granddaughter and loved her dearly. In a letter, Alexandrine's mother complained, "Why must grandpapas always spoil their grandchildren?"

It was the goal of Alexandrine's mother to become the mistress of King Louis XV of France. On 8 December 1744, a few months after Alexandrine's birth, the king's mistress, Madame de Châteauroux died, clearing the way for Madame Le Normant d'Étiolles. By March 1745, Alexandrine's mother had become the king's new lover and moved into the Palace of Versailles. At the king's request, Alexandrine's parents separated.

At the age of 6, Alexandrine was placed at the Convent of the Assumption in the rue Saint-Honoré in Paris for schooling alongside other daughters of the French nobility. At the age of 8, she was betrothed to the 11-year-old Louis Joseph d'Albert d'Ailly, Duke of Picquigny (1741–1792), son of Michel Ferdinand d'Albert d'Ailly, Duke of Chaulnes (1714–1769), with the agreement that she would marry Picquigny at the age of 12.

Death
On 4 June 1754, Alexandrine became ill at the Convent of the Assumption. Her father rushed to be by her side, but her mother (who by this time had been elevated to the rank of a duchess) who was at Versailles, could not come. Upon learning of her illness, Louis XV sent two of his own doctors to help, but the child had already died of acute peritonitis when they arrived. 
 
Her grandfather, François Poisson, died 11 days later, on 25 June 1754, devastated by his dear Fanfan's death. Her mother reportedly never recovered from the loss of her daughter and father within a few days.

References

1744 births
1754 deaths
Alexandrine
Deaths from peritonitis
Royalty and nobility who died as children